Airtel is a Bangladeshi telecommunications company. It was managed by Bharti Airtel Bangladesh until 2016 when Bharti Airtel Bangladesh merged its operations into Robi Axiata Ltd. Following the merger, Airtel Bangladesh remained a product brand of Robi Axiata. Since then, Robi Axiata is the brand licensing holder for Airtel in Bangladesh.

History 
In December 2005, Warid Telecom International LLC, an Abu Dhabi based consortium, paid US$50 million to obtain a GSM license from the Bangladesh Telecommunication Regulatory Commission (BTRC). In doing so, Warid Telecom became the sixth mobile phone operator in Bangladesh.

Takeover by Bharti Airtel
In 2010, Warid Telecom sold a majority 70% stake in the company to India's Bharti Airtel for US$300 million. Bharti's proposal also included an initial $300 million investment in Warid for creating new shares in the company. The BTRC approved the deal on 4 Jan 2010. Bharti Airtel Limited took control of the company and its board, and re-branded the company's services under its 'Airtel' brand starting on 20 December 2010.

In March 2013, Warid Telecom sold its remaining 30% share to Bharti Airtel's Singapore-based concern Bharti Airtel Holdings Pte Limited for US$85 million.

On 8 September 2013, Airtel Bangladesh licensed 5 MHz of the 3G spectrum for US$1.25 million.

Merger
In January 2016, Robi and Airtel Bangladesh announced that they intended to merge their Bangladesh operations. The combined entity, called Robi, would serve about 32 million subscribers. Axiata Group was to own 68.7% of the shares, Bharti Group was to own 25.0%, while the remaining 6.3% would be owned by NTT DoCoMo. The merger was completed in November 2016.

See also
 Airtel Africa
 Airtel India
 Airtel Sri Lanka

References

Mobile phone companies of Bangladesh
Bangladeshi subsidiaries of foreign companies
Bharti Airtel